Maine wine is made from fruit grown in the U.S. state of Maine. Most is made from fruit other than grapes, including apple, cranberry, and blueberry wines. A few wineries in Maine produce limited quantities of wine made from locally grown French hybrid grape varieties. Maine's climate is too cold for viticulture. The first winery in Maine, Bartlett Maine Estate Winery, was established in 1983.

See also

List of wineries in New England

References

External links
 Maine Wine Trail Maine Winery Guild 

 
Tourism in Maine
Wine regions of the United States by state